Morad Hibatan Bazar (also Romanized as Morād Hībatān Bāzār; also known as Kanar) is a village in Polan Rural District, Polan District, Chabahar County, Sistan and Baluchestan Province, Iran. At the 2006 census, its population was 44, in 7 families.

References 

Populated places in Chabahar County